Sadik Achmet (1 January 1947 – 24 July 1995) was a Greek doctor of medicine and politician of Turkish ethnicity. He founded the Party of Friendship, Equality and Peace.

He was elected to the Greek parliament in June 1989. He was sent to court on 24 January 1990 due to his declarations that the members of the Muslim minority in Thrace are Turks, and because he referred to himself as "Turk" in his election pamphlet. After a two-day trial he was found guilty of slander and misinformation by the Greek court and condemned to 18 months. Leaving the courtroom he stated "I am being taken to prison only because I am a Turk. If being a Turk is a crime, I repeat here that I am a Turk and I will remain so".

Sadik Achmet died in a controversial car accident when his car along with his wife and family drove into a tractor. Most Turkish politicians rejected that his death was a staged political assassination and not an accident.

Sources 
 Achmet, Sadik, profile on his party page.

References 

1947 births
1995 deaths
People from Komotini
Greek people of Turkish descent
Greek MPs 1989–1990
Greek MPs 1990–1993
Turkish nationalists
Road incident deaths in Greece
Greek MPs 1989 (June–November)